Frasselt is a village in the municipality of Kranenburg, Kreis Kleve in the German State of North Rhine-Westphalia.

Villages in North Rhine-Westphalia